

The Brügger MB-1, MB-2 and MB-3 Colibri is a family of small sports aircraft designed in Switzerland in the 1960s and 1970s for amateur construction.

Design and development
The Colibri family are single-seat, low-wing cantilever monoplanes with fixed tailwheel undercarriage powered by a four-cylinder horizontally opposed Volkswagen air-cooled engine automotive conversion.

The MB-1 Colibri first flew in 1965 and served as a development aircraft for the definitive MB-2 Colibri 2 that flew in 1970. These aircraft had all-wooden framework with fabric-covered wings and plywood-covered fuselages. The pilot's seat was enclosed by an expansive bubble canopy. In 1976-77, Brügger built and flew an all-metal version as the MB-3. Many examples are actively flying in 2012.

The MB-2 is noted for its handling qualities.

Specifications (MB-2)

References

 
 
 

1960s Swiss sport aircraft
Homebuilt aircraft
Colibri
Low-wing aircraft
Single-engined tractor aircraft
Aircraft first flown in 1965